Willie E. Gary is an American lawyer.

Early life and education 
Born Willie Edward Gary on July 12, 1947, in Eastman, GA he is the son of Turner (a sharecropper) and Mary Gary. He attended Shaw University on a football scholarship graduating in 1971. He earned his Juris Doctor degree from North Carolina Central University School of Law.

Career 
Gary has won a $240 million verdict against Disney for stealing the concept of the ESPN Wide World of Sports Complex. 

In 1995, Gary filed a lawsuit on behalf of Mississippi funeral home operator Jeremiah Joseph O'Keefe against Canadian businessman Raymond Loewen after Loewen reneged on a contractual agreement with O'Keefe. Gary won the case, with a jury awarding O'Keefe $500 million in punitive damages; although the case was settled afterward for $175 million, Gary's victory would eventually lead Loewen to resign from his firm, which later would be reorganized after a bankruptcy filing and be sold to a competitor, Service Corporation International.  The Loewen funeral company case is set to become a movie starring Jamie Foxx.

In 2019, a $23 billion case Gary won against R.J. Reynolds was overturned on appeal. The case stemmed from the death of Michael Johnson of Escambia County, Florida in 1996, who died from lung cancer.

Memberships 
Gary is a member of the American Bar Association, National Bar Association, and NAACP.

Awards and honors 
General Assembly of the State of South Carolina recognized him as one of the United States’ most respected and accomplished lawyers.

In 2019, the American Bar Association awarded him the Spirit of Excellence award at Caesar’s Palace in Las Vegas.

Personal life 
Gary owns two personal jets with the latest being named "Wings of Justice II". He is listed as one of the richest lawyers in the world.

He is married to Gloria Gary and has 5 children.

References 

1947 births
Living people
20th-century American lawyers
21st-century American lawyers
Georgia (U.S. state) lawyers
African-American lawyers
20th-century African-American people
21st-century African-American people